Celino Mora (born 21 October 1945) is a Paraguayan footballer. He played in 23 matches for the Paraguay national football team from 1967 to 1970. He was also part of Paraguay's squad for the 1967 South American Championship.

References

External links
 

1945 births
Living people
Paraguayan footballers
Paraguay international footballers
Sportspeople from Asunción
Association football forwards
Cerro Porteño players
C.D. Universidad Católica del Ecuador footballers
Barcelona S.C. footballers
C.D. Olmedo footballers
Deportivo Pereira footballers
Independiente Medellín footballers
Paraguayan expatriate footballers
Expatriate footballers in Ecuador
Expatriate footballers in Colombia
Paraguayan football managers
Deportivo Táchira F.C. managers
Portuguesa F.C. managers
Paraguayan expatriate football managers
Expatriate football managers in Venezuela
Aragua F.C. managers
Mineros de Guayana managers